Albert Weeks (23 July 1864 – 21 April 1948) was an Australian cricketer. He played in one first-class match for South Australia in 1887/88.

See also
 List of South Australian representative cricketers

References

External links
 

1864 births
1948 deaths
Australian cricketers
South Australia cricketers
Cricketers from Adelaide